Gəndov (also, Cəndov, Gendob, Gyandov, and Gyandova) is a village in the Ismailli Rayon of Azerbaijan.   The village forms part of the municipality of Qaraqaya.

References 

Populated places in Ismayilli District